The 2011–12 Hong Kong League Cup is the 11th edition of the Hong Kong League Cup. It is a knockout competition for all the teams of the 2011–12 Hong Kong First Division League.

Originally it would begin in October 2011, and will end in April 2012. However, due to lack of sponsorship, it was postponed to start in January 2012 after Halewinner Limited were announced as sponsors.

Calendar

Bracket

Match Records

First round

Quarter-finals

Semi-finals

Final

MATCH OFFICIALS
Assistant referees:
Chow Chun Kit
Cheng Oi Cho
Fourth official: Liu Kwok Man

MATCH RULES
90 minutes.
30 minutes of extra-time if necessary.
Penalty shoot-out if scores still level.
Seven named substitutes
Maximum of 3 substitutions.

Scorers
The scorers in the 2011–12 Hong Kong League Cup are as follows:

5 goals
 Jaimes McKee (TSW Pegasus)

2 goals

 Lee Hong Lim (TSW Pegasus)
 Leandro Carrijo (TSW Pegasus)
 Cheng Lai Hin (South China)
 Lo Kwan Yee (Kitchee)
 Roberto Losada (Kitchee)
 Jordi Tarrés (Kitchee)
 Festus Baise (Citizen)

1 goal

 Fong Pak Lun (Sham Shui Po)
 Lee Ka Ho (Sham Shui Po)
 Chan Wai Ho (South China)
 Chan Siu Ki (South China)
 Giovane (South China)
 William Gomes (Wofoo Tai Po)
 Clayton Afonso (Wofoo Tai Po)
 Mirko Teodorović (Tuen Mun)
 Liang Zicheng (Kitchee)
 Fernando Recio (Kitchee)
 Yago González (Kitchee)

Prizes

References

External links
 Hong Kong League Cup - Hong Kong Football Association

2011–12 domestic association football cups
Lea
2011-12